Kunzea linearis, also known by the Maori name rawiri manuka,  is a flowering plant in the myrtle family, Myrtaceae and is endemic to New Zealand. It is a densely-foliaged shrub or small tree, characterised by very narrow leaves and clusters of small white flowers with five petals and a large number of stamens, which are longer than the petals. It grows in the north of the North Island and is the most distinctive of the New Zealand kunzeas.

Description

Taxonomy and naming
Rawiri manuka was first formally described in 1889 by Thomas Kirk who gave it the name Leptospermum ericoides var. lineare and published the description in his book "The Forest Flora of New Zealand". In 2014 Peter James de Lange and Hellmut Toelken changed the name to Kunzea linearis. The specific epithet (linearis) is a Latin word meaning "linear", referring to the linear leaves of this species.

Distribution and habitat
Kunzea linearis mostly grows in coastal to lowland shrubland in impoverished soils and peat bogs. It mostly occurs in the northern part of the North Island from North Cape south to Ahipara and the Karikari Peninsula and sporadically south of there. It is the most distinctive of the New Zealand kunzeas.

Conservation
This kunzea is listed as "At Risk - Declining". The main threats to the species are loss of habitat, collecting for firewood and hybridisation with other kunzeas in urban settings.

Use in horticulture
Rawiri manuka is most easily propagated from fresh seed.

References

linearis
Endemic flora of New Zealand
Plants described in 1889
Taxa named by Thomas Kirk